Empire Wind  is a proposed utility-scale offshore wind farm on the Outer Continental Shelf Offshore New York.

The first phase of the project is expected to have a 816MW nameplate capacity generated by 60-80 wind turbines (each with an installed capacity of more than 15 MW), while the second part of the project is expected to generate 1,284 MW for a total of 2.1 GW of power. When both phases of the project are completed it will be able to power over 1,000,000 homes in New York. It was expected to come on line in late 2024, but postponed to late 2026.

Background
On September 8, 2011, the New York Power Authority, Long Island Power Authority, and Con Edison (the Offshore Wind Collaborative) filed a request with BOEM to issue a commercial lease on the outer continental shelf for the development of the Long Island - New York City Offshore Wind Project. This project would be located in the Atlantic Ocean off approximately 15-30 nautical miles off Nassau County in a long 65,000-acre wedge-shaped area between shipping channels, directionally aligned southwest of Rockaway Peninsula. The proposed project would have consisted of 138 offshore turbines, with a total nameplate generating capacity of 2,100MW. Given the lengthy permitting process, the Collaborative's proposed project would not be operational until 2018 at the earliest. On January 4, 2013, BOEM issued a Request for Interest (Docket ID: BOEM-2012-0083) to determine whether other parties were interested in developing the same area.

Development
The project won a competitive procurement for offshore wind renewable energy credits (ORECs) from the New York State Energy Research and Development Authority (NYSERDA) and is being developed by Equinor and BP, the latter of which acquired a 50% stake in the project in January 2021.

Aker Solutions is one of the companies that has been contracted for a front-end engineering and design (FEED) to study the design and delivery of concrete foundations for the wind turbine. The project will support the development of a large offshore wind assembly port located at the South Brooklyn Marine Terminal in Sunset Park, Brooklyn and wind-turbine tower manufacturing at the Port of Albany–Rensselaer.

NYISO issued a facilities study on June 14, 2021, requiring the project to be grid connected by June 14, 2025. Empire posted $42.6 million to secure that interconnection with Consolidated Edison. The project includes substations onshore and offshore, connected by 46 miles of cabling. The cables will be supplied by a new factory built by Nexans in Charleston, South Carolina.

The permission process and large project timeline is longer than the 4 years between NYISO study and first power delivery, and Empire requested an extension to the timeline. Empire prefers the Vestas V236-15 MW wind turbine for the project.

In March 2022, GE Bond was awarded a contract to build an onshore substation for Empire Wind I in Sunset Park Brooklyn. They will also produce interconnection cables for the Brooklyn point of interconnection.  The E. F. Barrett Power Station at Island Park, Long Island is planned to serve as the interconnection point to the power grid, after local politicians lobbied for that connection instead of the originally planned Gowanus Substation in Queens.

In September 2022, Empire Wind announced the continuation of a whale tracking program that began in 2019 with the Wildlife Conservation Society (WCS) to track whales in lease area through 2028. This will cover the entire pre-construction, construction, and post-construction phases of the project. The near real time data is available for the public at the New York Aquarium.

See also
Hudson Canyon
Wind power in the United States
List of offshore wind farms in the United States
List of offshore wind farms
Wind power in New York
Equinor operations by country

References 

Proposed wind farms in the United States
Offshore wind farms in the United States
Wind power in New York (state)
New York (state) infrastructure
Energy infrastructure on Long Island, New York